"Running" is the lead single from New Zealand alternative rock band Evermore's second studio album, Real Life (2006). The song was written by drummer Dann Hume and co-produced by lead vocalist Jon Hume with John Alagía. "Running" was issued on 5 June 2006, a month ahead of the album. The track subsequently peaked at  4 on New Zealand's RIANZ Singles Chart and No. 5 on Australia's ARIA Singles Chart.

Background
"Running" was released on 5 June 2006 ahead of Evermore's second album, Real Life, which appeared on 8 July by Warner. The single peaked at No. 4 on the RIANZ Singles Chart in New Zealand. The group consists of three New Zealand raised brothers, Jon (lead vocals, lead guitar), Peter (backing vocals, piano, keyboards, bass guitar), and Dann Hume (backing vocals, drums, rhythm guitar). It also reached No. 5 on the ARIA Singles Chart in their adopted country of Australia.

Music video
The video contains the band exploring different countries and cities around the world like Hong Kong, Sydney, London and Egypt. It has shots of the band walking on a beach in New Zealand, and Rangitoto Island can be seen in the background. The scarf that lead singer Jon Hume is wearing throughout the video is meant to be the same, as if he is "running" from one country to another. The New Zealand Heralds Rebecca Barry Hill interviewed the group, they described making the video We were completely self-sufficient making the video, as well', says Peter, who does the artwork. Dann: 'It's just us walking around the world. There's no smoke and mirrors making us look better-looking than we are. I think we're like that, just slightly raw.

Track listing

Personnel
 Jon Hume – lead vocals, lead guitar
 Peter Hume – keyboards, bass guitar, artwork
 Dann Hume – drums, rhythm guitar, backing vocals

Charts

Weekly charts

Year-end charts

Release history

References

Evermore (band) songs
2006 singles
2006 songs
Songs written by Dann Hume
Warner Music Australasia singles

es:Running (canción)